Hisar is a village in the Nurdağı District, Gaziantep Province, Turkey. The village is inhabited by Kurds and had a population of 529 in 2022.

References

Villages in Nurdağı District
Kurdish settlements in Gaziantep Province